Indian Village is an unincorporated community in Furnace Creek, Death Valley of Inyo County, California.

Indian Village lies at an elevation of 197 feet (60 m) below sea level.  Indian Village is located in the Death Valley Indian Community reservation of the Death Valley Timbisha Shoshone Band of California, within Death Valley National Park.  Approximately 50 members of the tribe live in Indian Village.

After unsuccessful efforts to remove the band to nearby reservations, National Park Service officials entered into an agreement with Timbisha Shoshone tribal leaders to allow the Civilian Conservation Corps to construct an Indian village for tribal members near park headquarters at Furnace Creek in 1938.

References

Timbisha
Native American populated places
Death Valley
Populated places in the Mojave Desert
Unincorporated communities in Inyo County, California
History of Inyo County, California
Native American history of California
Populated places established in 1938
1938 establishments in California
Unincorporated communities in California
Civilian Conservation Corps in California